Damdinsürengiin Nyamkhüü (born September 25, 1979 in Ulaanbaatar) is a Mongolian judoka.

Participating at the 2004 Olympics, he was stopped in the round of 32 by Gabriel Arteaga of Cuba.

He won the gold medal in the half-middleweight (81 kg) category of the 2006 Asian Games, having defeated Almas Atayev of Kazakhstan in the final match.

He currently resides in Ulaanbaatar.

References
 2006 Asian Games profile

External links
 

1979 births
Living people
Sportspeople from Ulaanbaatar
Mongolian male judoka
Judoka at the 2004 Summer Olympics
Judoka at the 2008 Summer Olympics
Olympic judoka of Mongolia
Asian Games medalists in judo
Judoka at the 2002 Asian Games
Judoka at the 2006 Asian Games
Asian Games gold medalists for Mongolia
Asian Games bronze medalists for Mongolia
Medalists at the 2002 Asian Games
Medalists at the 2006 Asian Games
20th-century Mongolian people
21st-century Mongolian people